Cardioceratidae is an extinct ammonite family belonging to the superfamily Stephanoceratoidea. These fast-moving nektonic carnivores lived during the Middle-Late Jurassic periods.

References

External links
Ammonites.fr

Jurassic ammonites
Late Jurassic first appearances
Late Jurassic extinctions
Ammonitida families
Stephanoceratoidea